The Zlín Z-XII was a Czechoslovak two-seat sports aircraft, and the first major design success by the Zlínská Letecká Akciová Společnost (Zlín) aircraft manufacturing company, after its founding in Otrokovice after the takeover by the Bata Group.

Design and development

The low-wing all-wooden aircraft was designed by Jaroslav Lonek. Two prototypes, with different engines, were presented in April 1935. These were subjected to an extensive test program.

The Z-XII, equipped with a  Zlin Persy II engine emerged as the winner from the tests. The Z-212 was an improved version, equipped with a Walter Mikron engine. The aircraft could come with an open cockpit or with a cockpit hood. It was a very popular aircraft and was exported to many countries.

Production of the Z-212 ran under German supervision after the occupation of Czechoslovakia. The German Luftwaffe operated  Z-XIIs and Z-212s until 1943, and about 20 Z-XIIs went to Slovakia. One Z-212 was captured by the Americans at the end of World War II. It was later used for sightseeing flights. Another Z-XII survived the war, being disassembled into parts in Otrokovice. It was later rebuilt and flew with the registration OK-ZJD.

A total of 201 Z-XIIs and 58 (other sources mention 51) Z-212s were built. 
Replicas of Z-XII and Z-212 have been built.

Variants
Z-XII Equipped with a  ZLAS or  Zlin Persy II engine
Z-212 Equipped with a Walter Mikron engine

Operators

Former civil operators

Former military operators

Czechoslovak Air Force operated this type postwar under designation K-72.

Luftwaffe (small numbers)
 Slovak Republic
Slovenské vzdušné zbrane

One Zlin 212 Tourist was impressed into service in India in 1942.

Yugoslav Royal Air Force – One aircraft was impressed into military service in April 1940.

Aircraft on display
Serbia
 Museum of Aviation (Belgrade) in Belgrade
Zlín Z-XII   is on display.

Czech Republic
 Prague Aviation Museum in Prague

Specifications (Z-XII)

Notes

External links

 Zlin XII replica

1930s Czechoslovakian military trainer aircraft
Zlin Z 12
1930s Czechoslovakian sport aircraft
Single-engined tractor aircraft
Low-wing aircraft
Aircraft first flown in 1935